Scarlett Johansson is an American actress who has received various awards and nominations, including one British Academy Film Award and one Tony Award. Additionally, she has been nominated for two Academy Awards and three additional British Academy Film Awards. In 2012, Johansson received a star on the Hollywood Walk of Fame for her contributions to the motion picture industry.

For Johansson's first leading role in Manny & Lo (1996), she was nominated for the Independent Spirit Award for Best Female Lead. Johansson's breakthrough role in the critically acclaimed comedy drama Lost in Translation (2003) won her the BAFTA Award for Best Actress in a Leading Role, and the Boston Society of Film Critics Award for Best Actress, and she was nominated for the Golden Globe Award for Best Actress – Motion Picture Comedy or Musical, and the MTV Movie Award for Best Breakthrough Performance. At age 19, Scarlett became one of the youngest BAFTA Award winners. In 2003, she starred in the UK Film Council's drama Girl with a Pearl Earring, for which she won the Los Angeles Film Critics Association Award for New Generation, and was nominated for the BAFTA Award for Best Actress in a Leading Role, Golden Globe Award for Best Actress in a Motion Picture – Drama, and BIFA Award for Best Performance by an Actress in a British Independent Film. In 2010, Johansson debuted on Broadway with A View from the Bridge, for which she won the Tony Award for Best Featured Actress in a Play and the Theatre World Award for Outstanding Stage Debut Performance, and was nominated for the Drama Desk Award for Outstanding Featured Actress in a Play.

Since 2010, Johansson has received one People's Choice Award and two Teen Choice Awards for playing the Marvel Cinematic Universe (MCU) character Natasha Romanoff / Black Widow. For her performance as a woman going through a coast-to-coast divorce in Netflix's Marriage Story (2019), Johansson won the Dallas–Fort Worth Film Critics Association Award for Best Actress, Detroit Film Critics Society Award for Best Actress, and she was nominated for the Academy Award for Best Actress, BAFTA Award for Best Actress in a Leading Role, Golden Globe Award for Best Actress in a Motion Picture – Drama, and Screen Actors Guild Award for Outstanding Performance by a Female Actor in a Leading Role. The same year, Johansson appeared in Taika Waititi's comedy-drama Jojo Rabbit. For her performance, she was nominated for the Academy Award for Best Supporting Actress, BAFTA Award for Best Actress in a Supporting Role, and Screen Actors Guild Award for Outstanding Performance by a Cast in a Motion Picture.

Major associations

Academy Awards

British Academy Film Awards

Golden Globe Awards

Screen Actors Guild Awards

Tony Awards

Other associations

Notes

References

External links
 

Johansson, Scarlett
Awards